Raccoon Creek is a stream in the U.S. state of Georgia. It is a tributary to the Chattooga River.

Raccoon Creek took its name from an old Cherokee settlement near its course called "Raccoon Town".

References

Rivers of Georgia (U.S. state)
Rivers of Chattooga County, Georgia